The Kanab movie fort was a filming set near the current Kanab Municipal Airport in Kanab, Utah. The military fort is an 1800s-era recreation constructed for The Yellow Tomahawk (United Artists 1954). During the filming of The Apple Dumpling Gang Rides Again, much of the fort was destroyed by fire in a special effects sequence that grew out of control. Some of the fort remains in need of refurbishment.

Films partially made at the set:

 Fort Yuma (1955)
 Fort Dobbs (1958)
 Sergeants 3 (1962)
 Daniel Boone TV series (1964)
 Branded TV series (1965)
 Duel at Diablo (1966) 
 The Plainsman (1966) 
 Cutter's Trail (1970) 
 One Little Indian (1973)
 The Apple Dumpling Gang Rides Again (1979)

References 

Film location shooting